A homojunction is a semiconductor interface that occurs between layers of similar semiconductor material, these materials have equal band gaps but typically have different doping. In most practical cases a homojunction occurs at the interface between an n-type (donor doped) and p-type (acceptor doped) semiconductor such as silicon, this is called a p–n junction. 

This is not a necessary condition as the only requirement is that the same semiconductor (same band gap) is found on both sides of the junction, in contrast to a heterojunction. An n-type to n-type junction, for example, would be considered a homojunction even if the doping levels are different.

The different doping level will cause band bending, and a depletion region will be formed at the interface, as shown in the figure to the right.

See also 
 Transistor
 p–n junction
 Band bending
 Doping (semiconductor)

Semiconductor structures